Simon Richard Baker III (born March 30, 1986) is an Aboriginal Canadian actor, of Cree, Haida, and Squamish descent. He hails from North Vancouver-Capilano, British Columbia. Baker began his filming career at the age nine in the movie Once in a Blue Moon. He played Charlie in North of 60.

Filmography
 Once in a Blue Moon (1995)
 Back to Turtle Island (1995)
 The Sweet Hereafter (1997) - Bear Otto
 Smoke Signals (1998) - Young Thomas Builds the Fire
 Big Bear (1998) - Horsechild
 Shanghai Noon (2000) - Little Feather
 Canada: A People's History (2000) - Vision Quest Boy
 Before We Ruled the Earth (2001) - Moak ("Buffalo Tracks")
 Spooky House (2002) - Prescott
 Now & Forever (2002) - Young John Myron
 Dream Storm (2001) - Charlie Muskrat (TV)
 Tribe of Joseph (2002) - Taan
 Another Country (2002) - Charlie Muskrat (TV)
 Dreamkeeper (2003) - Second Brother (TV)
 On the Corner (2003) - Randy Henry
 The Missing (2003) - Honesco
 Distant Drumming (2004) - Charlie Muskrat
 I, Robot (2004) - Farber Posse
 Buffalo Dreams (2005) - Thomas Blackhorse
 Into the West (2005) - Young loved by the Buffalo
 Buckaroo: The Movie (2005) - Jerome
 Crying 4 U (2007) - Joey
 The Stone Child (2008) - Roger

References

External links

Living people
1986 births
Canadian male television actors
First Nations male actors
People from North Vancouver
Male actors from British Columbia
20th-century Canadian male actors
21st-century Canadian male actors
Canadian male film actors